Admiral Sir Edward Vernon (30 October 1723 – 16 June 1794) was a Royal Navy officer who became Commander-in-Chief of the East Indies Station.

Naval career
He was promoted to lieutenant in 1743 during the War of the Austrian Succession and assigned to the 70-gun  under Captain Edward Hawke. Present at the Battle of Toulon in 1744 against a combined French and Spanish fleet, he and 22 other British seamen were sent by Hawke aboard the disabled enemy vessel Poder in order to secure her as a prize. Poder was heavily damaged, and Vernon and others began jury rigging masts in order to make her ready to sail. They neglected to observe a Spanish counter-attack and were captured.

Vernon was returned to British service as part of a prisoner exchange, and in 1747 was appointed as commander of the sloop HMS Baltimore. Knighted in June 1773, he became Commander-in-Chief, The Nore in 1775 and Commander-in-Chief of the East Indies Station in 1776 and took part in an indecisive action off Pondicherry on 10 August 1778 which at least forced the French fleet to retire to Mauritius, much booty and plunder having been seized by the British. Promoted to rear-admiral in March 1779, he returned to England in 1781. He was promoted to vice-admiral in 1787 and admiral in 1794. A monument to Vernon was placed in All Saints Church, at Binfield in Berkshire.

References

Bibliography

External links
 

1723 births
1794 deaths
Royal Navy admirals